Bryson Bernard (born December 22, 1982), better known by his stage name Cupid, is an American singer and songwriter from Lafayette, Louisiana. He is best known for the 2007 line dance single "Cupid Shuffle", which peaked at number 68 on the Billboard Hot 100.

History 
Bernard started singing in his church's choir, encouraged by his pastor father. He initially enrolled at the University of Louisiana at Lafayette with a full athletic scholarship in track and field. He left the track team to form a singing group known as Fasho, which later changed its name to Fifth Element. After Fifth Element was dissolved, Bernard pursued a solo career. He sang at venues such as talent shows, weddings and funerals. With a five-octave vocal range, Bernard earned the nickname "Cupid" for an impressive performance of the late-'90s 112 hit single "Cupid".

Music career 
The singer first received radio airplay in 2001 with his self-released first single, "Do Ya Thang". His second self-released album, 2005's The King of Down South R&B, gained airplay throughout the region, from Florida to Texas. In January 2007, shortly before the release of his third album, Time For a Change, he was signed to Atlantic Records. His first single from that album, "Cupid Shuffle", peaked at No. 66 on the Billboard Hot 100 and No. 21 on the Hot R&B/Hip-Hop Songs chart. Since then the song has gone double platinum and gets roughly 6,500 new downloads each week. His other singles include "Say Yes", "Happy Dance",  "The Love Slide" and "Do My Ladies Run This Party".

In 2008, Cupid broke the Guinness World Record for the largest line dance assembled with over 17,000 people in Atlanta at Ebony's Black Family Reunion Tour.

In addition, Cupid's music can be heard in the films Step Up 2: The Streets, P.S. I Love You, Nancy Drew, and Jumping the Broom.

In 2012, he auditioned for the third season of the American music competition The Voice singing for his blind audition his own hit "Cupid Shuffle" in a varied version. None of the four judges Adam Levine, Cee Lo Green, Christina Aguilera or Blake Shelton pressed their "I Want You" button, thus eliminating him from further competition. But Cee Lo Green recognized Cupid after he finished the song and asked him to perform another tune to prove that "he can sing". After recognizing his true musical talent, the judges said that he should have tried a different song to help present his voice better.

Shows 

 Judge Mathis
 The People's Court
 The Steve Wilkos Show
 The Drew Barrymore Show
 The Kelly Clarkson Show
Hot Bench
 The Real
Divorce Court
Maury
 WWE Raw
WWE SmackDown
 Tamron Hall
 The Talk
 Family Feud
 25 Words or Less
 TMZ

Music 
WGCI-FM
WVAZ-FM

Discography

Albums 
2002: Cupid
2005: The King of Down South R&B
2007: Time for a Change
2012: Feel Good Music

Singles 
2001: "Do Ya Thing"
2007: "Do Yo Dance"
2007: "Say Yes"
2007: "Cupid Shuffle"
2008: "Happy Dance"
2008: "Love Slide"
2010: "Do My Ladies Run This Party"

Album appearances 
"All I Need" – Nancy Drew soundtrack
"369" (feat. B.o.B) – Step Up 2: The Streets (soundtrack)

Filmography 
2012: "The Voice"

References

External links 

1982 births
Living people
Atlantic Records artists
The Voice (franchise) contestants
Rhythm and blues musicians from New Orleans
American contemporary R&B singers
African-American  male singer-songwriters
Musicians from Lafayette, Louisiana
American male pop singers
Singer-songwriters from Louisiana
Dance-pop musicians
21st-century African-American male singers